Her Majesty & the Wolves is a musical duo that consists of Pussycat Dolls member showgirl Kimberly Wyatt, who provides lead vocals, and a former Jupiter Rising member Spencer Nezey, who acts as MC and producer for the group. Their debut studio album 111 was released in UK in July 2011.

History
Wyatt and Nezey first formed the group after a strong musical connection was made when working on Kimberly's debut studio album in Los Angeles. When recording her debut album, Kimberly became frustrated when most of the producers that she worked with were focusing on "making something that people will listen to now". Whereas Nezey wanted to make something that "people will listen to in the future", which Kimberly agreed with. The duo released a new track, "Glaciers" on 27 August 2010 as a free download from their website. On 9 November 2010, the duo released the official music video for their first mainstream single "Stars in Your Eyes". The group released "Stars in Your Eyes" as their first official single on 10 January 2011. On 11 July 2011 their debut album 111 was released in the UK.
Kimberly Wyatt posted on Twitter that there was going to be a 111: Part 2 released in 2013 or 2014.

Musical influences
The duo have stated that their musical influences include Florence and the Machine, Sia, Empire of the Sun and Ladyhawke.

Discography

Studio albums
111 (2011)

Singles

Remixes
"Glaciers" (Ashtrobot remix)
"Glaciers" (Roksonix remix)
"Stars in Your Eyes" (Sidney Samson Club Remix)

Mixtapes
Her Majesty & the Wolves Presents: Spring 2010 Mixtape

Music videos

References

External links
 
 
 Her Majesty & the Wolves video interview on Virgin Red Room

Musical groups established in 2010
Electronic music duos
2010 establishments in England